The Diamond Craters is a monogenetic volcanic field about  southeast of Burns, Oregon.  The field consists of a  area of basaltic lava flows, cinder cones, and maars. The  reexamination of radiocarbon dates from older studies and interpretation of paleomagnetic data and new radiocarbon dates limits the eruption of volcanic vents in this volcanic field to the time period between 7320 and 7790 calendar years B.P.

Diamond Craters and the nearby Diamond post office were named after the Diamond Ranch, established in the area by the pioneer Mace McCoy.  The ranch used a diamond-shaped brand, hence the name.

In the 1970s, Diamond Craters was a source of controversy between the Bureau of Land Management and commercial stonecutters who were illegally removing slabs of lava to sell as veneer for fireplaces, home exteriors, and chimneys. Geologists familiar with the area cited the craters' unusual research value, a "museum of basaltic volcanic features" apt to be destroyed by slab harvesting and associated heavy equipment. In 1982, the area gained additional protection when it was designated an Outstanding Natural Area.

Notable vents

References

External links

 Bureau of Land Management: Official Diamond Craters Outstanding Natural Area website
 Deschutes & Ochoco National Forests: Diamond Craters
 Volcano World.edu: Diamond Craters, Oregon
 Bureau of Land Management: "Diamond Craters Recreation Area Management Plan"

Volcanoes of Oregon
Volcanic fields of Oregon
Shield volcanoes of the United States
Volcanic crater lakes
Maars of Oregon
Landforms of Harney County, Oregon
Bureau of Land Management areas in Oregon
Protected areas of Harney County, Oregon